African-American Vernacular English (AAVE) has been the center of controversy about the education of African-American youths, the role AAVE should play in public schools and education, and its place in broader society.

Overview
By definition, as a vernacular dialect of English, AAVE has not received the social prestige of a standard dialect, leading to widespread and long-standing misconceptions that it is a grammatically inferior form of English, which linguistics research of the twentieth century has refuted. However, educators and social commentators traditionally have advocated for eliminating AAVE usage through the public-education system for a variety of reasons, ranging from a continued belief that AAVE is intrinsically deficient to arguments that its use, by being stigmatized in certain social contexts, is socially limiting. Some of the harshest criticism of AAVE or its use has come from African Americans themselves. A conspicuous example was the "Pound Cake speech", in which Bill Cosby criticized some African Americans for various social behaviors, including the way they talked.

Faced with such attitudes, the Conference on College Composition and Communication (CCCC), a division of National Council of Teachers of English (NCTE), issued a position statement on students' rights to their own language. This was adopted by CCCC members in April 1974 and appeared in a special issue of College Composition and Communication in Fall of 1974. The resolution was as follows:

We affirm the students' right to their own patterns and varieties of language—the dialects of their nurture or whatever dialects in which they find their own identity and style. Language scholars long ago denied that the myth of a standard American dialect has any validity. The claim that any one dialect is unacceptable amounts to an attempt of one social group to exert its dominance over another. Such a claim leads to false advice for speakers and writers and immoral advice for humans. A nation proud of its diverse heritage and its cultural and racial variety will preserve its heritage of dialects. We affirm strongly that teachers must have the experiences and training that will enable them to respect diversity and uphold the right of students to their own language.

Around this time, pedagogical techniques similar to those used to teach English to speakers of foreign languages were shown to hold promise for speakers of AAVE. William Stewart experimented with the use of dialect readers—sets of text in both AAVE and standard English. The idea was that children could learn to read in their own dialect and then shift to "Standard English" with subsequent textbooks.  developed a comprehensive set of dialect readers, called bridge readers, which included the same content in three different dialects: AAVE, a "bridge" version that was closer to "Standard American English" without being prohibitively formal, and a Standard English version. Despite studies that showed promise for such "Standard English as a Second Dialect" (SESD) programs, reaction to them was largely hostile and both Stewart's research and the Bridge Program were rejected for various political and social reasons, including strong resistance from parents.

A more formal shift in the recognition of AAVE came in the "Ann Arbor Decision" of 1979 (Martin Luther King Junior Elementary School Children et al., v. Ann Arbor School District). In it, a federal judge of the Eastern District of Michigan ruled that in teaching black children to read, a school board must adjust to the children's dialect, not the children to the school, and that, by not taking students' language into consideration, teachers were contributing to the failure of such students to read and use mainstream English proficiently.

National attitudes towards AAVE were revisited when a controversial resolution from the Oakland (California) school board (Oakland Unified School District) on December 18, 1996, called for "Ebonics" to be recognized as a language of African Americans. In fact, ebonics would be classified as a "second language". The proposal was to implement a program similar to the Language Development Program for African American Students (LDPAAS) in Los Angeles, which began in 1988 and uses methods from the SESD programs mentioned above.

Like other similar programs, the Oakland resolution was widely misunderstood as intended to teach AAVE and "elevate it to the status of a written language." It gained national attention and was derided and criticized, most notably by Jesse Jackson and Kweisi Mfume who regarded it as an attempt to teach slang to children. The statement that "African Language Systems are genetically based" also contributed to the negative reaction because "genetically" was popularly misunderstood to imply that African Americans had a biological predisposition to a particular language. In an amended resolution, this phrase was removed and replaced with wording that states African American language systems "have origins in West  and Niger–Congo languages and are not merely dialects of English ..."

The Oakland proposal was explained as follows:  that black students would perform better in school and more easily learn standard American English if textbooks and teachers incorporated AAVE in teaching black children to speak Standard English rather than mistakenly equating nonstandard with substandard and dismissing AAVE as the latter.  point to these linguistic barriers, and common reactions by teachers, as a primary cause of reading difficulties and poor school performance.

More recently, research has been conducted on the over-representation of African Americans in special education   argue that this is because AAVE speech characteristics are often erroneously considered to be signs of speech development problems, prompting teachers to refer children to speech pathologists.

According to Smitherman, the controversy and debates concerning AAVE in public schools imply deeper deterministic attitudes towards the African-American community as a whole. Smitherman describes this as a reflection of the "power elite's perceived insignificance and hence rejection of Afro-American language and culture". She also asserts that African Americans are forced to conform to European American society in order to succeed, and that conformity ultimately means the "eradication of black language ... and the adoption of the linguistic norms of the white middle class." The necessity for "bi-dialectialism" (AAVE and General American) means "some blacks contend that being bi-dialectal not only causes a schism in the black personality, but it also implies such dialects are 'good enough' for blacks but not for whites."

Ann Arbor decision
The case of Martin Luther King Junior Elementary School Children et al. v. Ann Arbor School District, known as the Ann Arbor Decision, is considered to have established an important precedent in the education of poor African American students who are Black English speakers.

The case was decided on July 12, 1979, by Judge Charles W. Joiner on the United States District Court for the Eastern District of Michigan. The suit was brought on behalf of poor black students at the school.  Gabe Kaimowitz, lead counsel for the Plaintiffs, alleged that the students were denied equal protection of the laws, because applicable Michigan regulations did not recognize social, economic and cultural factors differing those pupils from others.  Black middle class students at the school were not represented among the plaintiffs.  Judge Joiner in 1977 and 1978 rejected five of the six claims.  The sixth claim asserted that the Ann Arbor School District violated federal statutory law because it failed to take into account the home language of the children in the provision of education instruction. The court agreed. The judge ordered the school district to find a way to identify Black English speakers in the schools and to "use that knowledge in teaching such students how to read standard English".

Cases that led to the Ann Arbor Decision 
In 1954, most of the United States had racially segregated schools, which was made legal by the Plessy v. Ferguson case in 1896. In the case it held that segregated public schools were constitutional as long as the black and white children in the schools were equal. Throughout the middle of the twentieth century many civil rights groups and leaders challenged the school board's racial segregation through legal and political action. One of the actions, Brown v. Board of Education was filed, and is an important and significant case, which ultimately led up to the Ann Arbor Decision. The Brown v. Board of Education case was filed against Topeka and it went over how it violated the 14th amendment. The case paved the way for integration in many public schools across the United States, but black students still faced many problems as stated in the Ann Arbor Decision.

Oakland Ebonics resolution
On December 18, 1996, the Oakland Unified School District in California passed a controversial resolution recognizing the legitimacy of Ebonicswhat mainstream linguists more commonly term African American English (AAE)as an African language. The resolution set off a firestorm of media criticism and ignited a national debate.

For students whose primary language was Ebonics, the Oakland resolution mandated some instruction in this, both for "maintaining the legitimacy and richness of such language ... and to facilitate their acquisition and mastery of English language skills." This also included the proposed increase of salaries of those proficient in both Ebonics and Standard English to the level of those teaching limited English proficiency (LEP) students and the use of public funding to help teachers learn AAE themselves.

Popular response
Some interpretations of the controversial issues in the resolution include the idea that Ebonics is not a vernacular or dialect of English, that it is a separate language; a member of an African language family; that speakers of Ebonics should qualify for federally funded programs traditionally restricted to bilingual populations; and that students would be taught American Standard English via Ebonics. The Rev. Jesse Jackson criticized the resolution, saying "I understand the attempt to reach out to these children, but this is an unacceptable surrender, borderlining on disgrace." His comments were seconded by former Secretary of Education William Bennett, former New York governor Mario Cuomo, and Senator Joe Lieberman.  Jackson would later reverse his position, attributing his initial opposition to a misunderstanding of the school district's proposal.  He said, "They're not trying to teach Black English as a standard language.  They're looking for tools to teach children standard English so they might be competitive."

Amended resolution
The original resolution caused a great deal of consternation and anger, which fueled the controversy. On January 15, 1997, Oakland's school board passed an amended resolution. The original resolution used the phrase "genetically based" which was commonly understood to mean that African Americans have a biological predisposition to a particular language, while the authors of the resolution insisted that it was referring to linguistic genetics. This phrase was removed in the amended resolution and replaced with the assertion that African American language systems "have origins in West and Niger-Congo languages and are not merely dialects of English."

While traditionally understood to be generally factual that European owners of enslaved Africans often intentionally mixed Africans who spoke different languages to discourage communication in any language other than English, the truth is that Africans were strategically placed in certain types of settings.  West Africans were primarily (not exclusively) placed in non-field work in the upper southern colonies and West Central/Central Africans were primarily (not exclusively) placed in field based work in the lower southern colonies.

Africans in primarily non-field work typically had extensive interaction with Europeans in the early period, with cultural influence being bi-directional.  Colonies typically preferred certain African ethnic groups, some very selective (South Carolina for example), others a bit more loose but still maintained a level of preference (Virginia for example). 

West Central and Central Africans brought with them a homogenous culture that superseded West African culture early on in establishing African American culture, at a later point in history, West African influence displays itself in African American culture. 

Interaction between West Africans and West Central/Central Africans did occur, creating a lingua franca, however the culture of African Americans was heavily affected by the homogeneity and relatively isolated Bantu imported population. Later influence from West Africa presents itself in African American culture. 

African American speech however is heavily based in Bantu culture (but not exclusively, includes West Africa to some extent), as such, it is responsible for African Americans' language patterns, combining an African substrate with the topical usage of primarily non-African words. English heard was filtered through African language systems and culture.

Linguists' response

Some linguists and associated organizations issued statements in support of recognizing the legitimacy of African American English as a language system:

Walt Wolfram, a linguist at North Carolina State University, wrote that this controversy exposed the intensity of people's beliefs and opinions about language and language diversity, the persistent and widespread level of public misinformation about the issues of language variation and education, and the need for informed knowledge about language diversity and its role in education and in public life.

However, in response to the amended resolution claiming that African American language systems "are not merely dialects of English", there have been some statements in opposition from linguists, since linguists do primarily regard African-American English as a dialect or variety of English.

See also

 African American Vernacular English
 Bilingual education
 Bilingual Education Act
 Castañeda v. Pickard
 Lau v. Nichols - This 1974 U.S. Supreme Court decision established the right of language-minority students to educational accommodations.

Citations

General references 

 

 
 
 
 
 
 
 
 
 
 
 
 
 
 Dictionary of American Regional English. 5 vols. Cambridge: Harvard University Press, 1985–. 
 
 
 

 
 
 
 
 
 

 
 
 
 
 
 
 
 
 
 
 
 
 
 

 

 
 
 
 
 
 
 
 

 
 
 
 
 
 
 
 
 
 
 
 
 

 
 

 
 
 

 
 
 
 
 
 
 Sounding "Black" : an Ethnography of Racialized Vocality at Fisk University

Further reading
Original Oakland Resolution on Ebonics.
Amended Resolution.

Labov, William. "Some Sources of Reading Problems". Language in the Inner City. Philadelphia: University of Pennsylvania, 1972.

Linguistic Society of America. Resolution on the Oakland Ebonics debate. 1 July 1997: Adopted by LSA membership in a mail ballot.
 
Teachers of English to Speakers of Other Languages (TESOL). Policy Statement of the TESOL Board on African American Vernacular English. March 10, 1997.
Weldon, Tracey L. (Autumn 2000). "Reflections on the Ebonics Controversy". American Speech, Vol. 75, No. 3, Diamond Anniversary Essays. pp. 275–277.

  Text of Decision
 Oral Histories from students involved in the case

External links 
 Center for Applied Linguistics. "Dialects: African American Vernacular English". Links to "a variety of resources related to African American Vernacular English", a lot of them hosted by the Center, many directly related to this controversy.
 Rich, Frank. "The Ebonic Plague". The New York Times, 8 January 1997.

1979 in education
1979 in Michigan
1979 in United States case law
1996 controversies in the United States
1996 in California
1996 in education
African-American English
African-American history in Oakland, California
African-American-related controversies
Education in Oakland, California
Legal history of Michigan
Linguistic controversies
Minority rights case law
Political controversies in the United States
United States district court cases
United States education case law
African Americans and education